Walter Medeford  was the Dean of Wells during 1414.

References

Deans of Wells